MityLite, Inc. is an American manufacturer of tables, chairs, portable dance floors, staging, and other event furniture.

Overview

MityLite® is a global manufacturer of commercial furniture. Based in Orem, Utah, MityLite is part of the MITY Incorporated family of product brands, which include Holsag, Bertolini, and Broda. MityLite manufactures and sells banquet chairs, folding tables, a sprung dance floor, folding chairs, stacking chairs, Chiavari chairs, outdoor furniture, and other event furnishings for the hospitality industry and other public spaces.

MityLite's first product was the ABS plastic-top folding table, which features a unique design of an ABS plastic top and bottom surface bonded to a hardwood core frame. In the mid-1990s, MityLite introduced steel and aluminum-framed banquet chairs with custom upholstery. The company’s banquet chair designs were honed over the next few years, eventually leading to MityLite’s patents for the FormFlex® seat base and the flex-back recline system. 

In 2008-2009, MityLite designed and launched FlexOne® and MeshOne® folding chairs for offices, sports stadiums, and other public venues. Numerous patents for comfort-specific features were granted prior to the product launches. 

An expansive outdoor furniture line called Vita was launched in 2022, featuring over 100 café tables, chairs, pool chairs, couches, sectionals, and other furnishings for resorts, restaurants, rooftop bars, and other upscale venues.

MityLite is an environmentally-friendly company and uses recycled content in all its ABS tables. Chairs and tables are Greenguard® Certified and most are fully recyclable.

Timeline 
1987 — Founded by Greg Wilson in Orem, Utah with the original ABS folding table 

1995 — Launched banquet chair & stacking chair lines 

1999 — Launched SwiftSet® folding chair; ships 1,000,000th table 

2006 — Launched Magnattach® portable dance floor 

2008 — Launched MeshOne® folding chair 

2009 — Launched FlexOne® folding chair 

2011 — Launched Reveal linenless tables & 4 new banquet chairs 

2012 — Launched MeshOne™ office folding chair 

2017 — Acquired XpressPort Carts; expands Elevare & Tavolo product lines; new MityLite logo and website launched 

2019 — Expanded Reveal linenless tables; introduced new CEO Tony R. Smith 

2022 — Launched Vita Outdoor line for hotels, restaurants, and event venues

History
MityLite® was founded In 1987 by Greg Wilson, who owned Church Furnishings, Inc, a company that made pews and other church furniture. He secured a $1 million contract order with the Church of Jesus Christ of Latter-day Saints for a banquet table he had developed. However, Wilson lacked the financing to manufacture the table. After a deal with Samsonite failed, Wilson incorporated as MITY Enterprises, Inc., with US$500,000 from Angel Investors.

In March 1994, MITY Enterprises went public, selling 900,000 shares of common stock at US$5.25 per share. The company was listed on the NASDAQ under the ticker symbol MITY. In July 2007 Mity Enterprises merged with Sorenson Capital and Peterson Partners, both Salt Lake City-based private equity firms.

Prospect Capital Corp. became the parent company of MITY in September of 2013. Tony R. Smith was named CEO in April of 2019.

Awards and recognition
In November 2009, MityLite was awarded Manufacturer of the Year by Utah's Manufacturing Extension Partnership.

References

External links
 MityLite corporate website

Manufacturing companies established in 1987
Furniture companies of the United States
Manufacturing companies based in Utah
1987 establishments in Utah
Companies based in Orem, Utah